Hubert Evans may refer to:

Hubert Evans (author), Canadian writer
Hubert Evans Non-Fiction Prize
Hubert Evans or Hugh Evans (basketball) (1941–2022), American basketball referee
Hubert Roy Evans or Roy Evans, Welsh civil engineer and academic
Bert Evans, footballer

See also
Bert Evans (disambiguation)